The First Step: Chapter Three is the third single album by South Korean boy band Treasure. It was released as the follow-up to The First Step: Chapter Two on November 6, 2020, through YG Entertainment and distributed through YG Plus. The single album was released for pre-order on 27 October. The single album was produced by Aftrshok, Czaer and Future Bounce. The First Step: Chapter Three is primarily a rap/hip hop record with lo-fi and trap elements.

Background
On October 26, 2020, it was confirmed that Treasure would release their third single album on November 6, three months since their debut and 49 days since the release of their second single album, The First Step: Chapter Two. On October 27, the concept video for the album was uploaded. A 35-second clip, the 12 members were presented and gave a hint on the album concept. Pre-orders for the album began on October 27. On October 28, the title poster for the album was revealed. On October 29, the track list for the album was revealed. The album will contain a total of four tracks, including two new songs and their instrumental versions. Members Yoshi, Choi Hyun-suk and Haruto were credited as writers, while Asahi was credited as not only the writer but also as a composer for the first time. Starting from November 2, the group revealed 18 seconds of the dance clip of the lead single "Mmm" five times every midnight, revealing half the song, which is approximately 1 minute and 30 seconds, prior to the release of the album. Individual member posters were uploaded from November 2 to November 3. On November 5, a concept video and poster of "Mmm" were uploaded.

On November 19, a "coming soon" poster with artwork drawn by Asahi was uploaded, teasing the live performance video of "Orange".

Composition 
According to YG Entertainment, "Mmm" is "a song in typical hip hop genre with a BPM of 80", which is "slower than the previous releases, but it will be a song sending off a stronger impression”. Same as Treasure's two previous single albums, The First Step: Chapter One and The First Step: Chapter Two, the song's main theme is "the emotions of a boy who fell in love". In the countdown live held by the group on November 6, 2020, the song is described as "a hybrid trap song with a strong groove". The group voiced their desire to "present hip hop in a young mood" through the song. In particular, member Choi Hyun-suk stated that he "express[ed] [his] thoughts and emotions of [his] 20s" through the lyrics of the song.

"Orange" is a "ballad genre song which emphasizes emotions of newtro and lo-fi". The lyrics of the song "shows how [lovers] hold on to time because they do not want to part [until each other turns to orange under the sunset]". The song "presents warmness like the sun that rises every day". Member Asahi, composer and writer of the song, "made it in the accommodation because the topline of the song flashed across [his] mind".

Promotion 
On November 6, 2020, Treasure held an 80-minute "countdown live" through V Live. The group explained their music and visuals through the broadcast. The music video for "Mmm" was released on the same day and surpassed 10 million views in approximately 72 hours since its release on YouTube. The group performed the song on various music programs of South Korea such as Show! Music Core and Inkigayo.

Commercial performance
The First Step: Chapter Three surpassed 210,000 physical pre-orders, making Treasure a "Half a Million Seller". The single album rank 1st in the Gaon Album Chart on the 46th issued week of 2020. It debuted at number four on the monthly album chart, selling around 218,855 copies in November. Without any local promotional activities, the lead single "Mmm" topped Rakuten Music's Real-time Comprehensive Rankings, the third time since their debut. The song moved around from no. 1 to no. 4 for four days on the chart. Furthermore, the song charted-in on 93 regional charts including Apple Music. On November 14, the album topped Hanteo's Daily Album Sales chart.

Track listing

Charts

Weekly charts

Monthly charts

Year-end charts

Certifications and sales

Release history

References

2020 albums
Treasure (band) albums
YG Entertainment albums
Korean-language albums
Single albums